Jean-Rémy Bessieux (24 December 1803 – 30 April 1876), also seen as Jean-Rémi or Jean René, was the founder of the Roman Catholic mission in Gabon and the first bishop to serve there.

Born in Vélieux in Montpellier, France, Bessieux had been a parish priest and seminary teacher when he entered the Holy Heart of Mary Congregation in August 1842. (The group had been founded to evangelize the black races, and would merge with the Holy Ghost Fathers in 1848.)

Travelling with Brother Grégoire Say, Bessieux arrived in Gabon September 1844, and settled at Okolo, a village in the Agekaza-Quaben clan's area, not far from the French fort. Bessieux learned Mpongwe, and published a grammar of it in 1847. He also established a school for boys, a church, and arranged the 1849 arrival of the Immaculate Conception Sisters of Castres.

Elevated to bishop in December 1848, his efforts in the 1850s to establish additional outposts in the Gabon Estuary were not successful. Even so, he continued in Gabon until his death in 1876, sometimes without official support, and with only occasional brief visits to Europe to recover his health. Gardinier observes that Bessieux's determination to stay in Gabon probably influenced the French government's decision to maintain their base.

Bessieux was remembered on the 100th anniversary of his death by a postage stamp of Gabon.

References

 David E. Gardinier, Historical Dictionary of Gabon, 2nd ed. (The Scarecrow Press, 1994) p. 61
 R. P. Roques, Le Pionnier du Gabon Jean-Rémy Bessieux (Paris, 1957)

External links
 catholic-hierarchy.org page on Bessieux
 Mgr Bessieux (Saint-Pons-de-Thomières)

1803 births
1876 deaths
French Roman Catholic bishops in Africa
Gabonese Roman Catholic bishops
French Roman Catholic missionaries
Roman Catholic missionaries in Gabon
French expatriates in Gabon
Roman Catholic bishops of Libreville